Cheshmeh-ye Abgarm (also Romanized as Cheshmeh-ye Ābgarm) is a village in Mobarakabad Rural District, in the Central District of Qir and Karzin County, Fars Province, Iran. At the 2006 census, its population was 16, in 4 families.

References 

Populated places in Qir and Karzin County